Casa Del Mar (also known as the Thomas Case House) is a historic house located at 25 South Washington Drive in Sarasota, Florida.

Description and history 
On February 14, 1997, it was added to the National Register of Historic Places. Thomas Reed Martin is credited as the home's architect.

References

External links
 Sarasota County listings at National Register of Historic Places
 Casa Del Mar at Portal of Historic Resources, State of Florida

Houses in Sarasota, Florida
Houses on the National Register of Historic Places in Sarasota County, Florida
Houses completed in 1937